Barolo is a comune (municipality) in the Province of Cuneo in the Italian region Piedmont, located about  southeast of Turin and about  northeast of Cuneo.

Barolo borders the following municipalities: Castiglione Falletto, La Morra, Monforte d'Alba, Narzole, and Novello. Barolo is an important wine-producing area noted for its Barolo wine of the same name, and many wineries such as Poderi Colla have vineyards here.

Barolo is home to the multi colored art project The Chapel of Barolo by American artist Sol LeWitt and English artist David Tremlett created in 1999.

Demographic evolution

References 

Cities and towns in Piedmont